Millennium Monument may refer to:

Millennium Monument (Russia) (1862)
Millennium Monument of Brest, Belarus
Millennium Monument (Budapest) (1904), the central feature in Budapest's Heroes' Square
China Millennium Monument, Beijing (1999)
Kolonna Eterna, San Gwann (2003)
Millennium Monument (Chicago) (2002)
Millennium Monument (Malaysia)（2003）